"Lowrider" is the second single by Cypress Hill from the album Stoned Raiders. The song is featured in the British TV series Soccer AM. The song was the second part of the double A-Side single it shared with "Trouble" in Europe. "Lowrider" was not released until February elsewhere.

On the album, there is a hidden track. The hidden track is rather ominous as it features a slow drum beat and a low pitched organ that only plays five notes. This lasts for around two minutes.

Track listing

Charts

Personnel
B-Real - Vocals
Sen Dog - Vocals
DJ Muggs - Arranger, Producer, Mixing

Notes

A  "Lowrider" and "Trouble" were released together as a double A-side single in several European territories.

B  "Lowrider" did not enter the Hot R&B/Hip-Hop Songs chart, but peaked at number 8 on the Bubbling Under R&B/Hip-Hop Singles chart, which acts as a 25-song extension to the R&B/Hip-Hop Songs chart.

References

2002 singles
2001 songs
Cypress Hill songs
Columbia Records singles
Songs written by DJ Muggs
Songs written by B-Real
Songs written by Sen Dog
Song recordings produced by DJ Muggs